Sarah Höfflin (born 8 January 1991) is an Olympic Swiss freestyle skier. She won a gold medal in big air at Winter X Games XXII, and won gold in slopestyle at the 2018 Winter Olympics in Pyeongchang, South Korea.

Early life and education 
Höfflin lived in the UK between the ages of 12 and 22, living in Tewkesbury, where she attended Tewkesbury School, before attending Cardiff University, where she graduated with a degree in neuroscience. She was a late starter as a freestyle skier, only taking up the sport in her early 20s when competing at British Universities' Snowsports Council competitions after leaving university and returning to Switzerland.

References

External links
X Games Profile
FIS Profile

1991 births
Living people
X Games athletes
Swiss female freestyle skiers
Freestyle skiers at the 2018 Winter Olympics
Freestyle skiers at the 2022 Winter Olympics
Olympic freestyle skiers of Switzerland
Medalists at the 2018 Winter Olympics
Olympic gold medalists for Switzerland
Olympic medalists in freestyle skiing
Alumni of Cardiff University
Sportspeople from Geneva
21st-century Swiss women